Clozapine N-oxide (CNO) is a synthetic drug used mainly in biomedical research as a ligand to activate DREADD receptors. Although CNO was initially believed to be biologically inert and an agonist of DREADDs, it has been shown not to enter the brain after administration and to reverse metabolise in vivo into clozapine which has a series of effects on the DREADDs as well as serotonin and dopamine receptors.

Alternatives to CNO with more affinity, more inert character, and faster kinetics include Compound 21 (C21) and deschloroclozapine (DCZ).

References 

Neuroscience
Pharmacology